Telstra Tower (also known as Black Mountain Tower and formerly Telecom Tower) is a telecommunications tower and lookout that is situated above the summit of Black Mountain in Australia's capital city of Canberra. It is named after Australia's largest telecommunications company, Telstra Corporation. The Tower sits within the InfraCo division, which is responsible for its operations and maintenance.

It is currently closed with no planned date of when it will open.

History
In April 1971 the Postmaster General (PMG) at the time commissioned the Commonwealth Department of Housing and Construction to carry out a feasibility study in relation to a tower on Black Mountain accommodating both communication services and facilities for visitors. The tower was to replace the microwave relay station on Red Hill and the television broadcast masts already on Black Mountain.

Design of the tower was the responsibility of the Department of Housing and Construction, however a conflict arose with the National Capital Development Commission which, at the time, had complete control over planning within the Australian Capital Territory.

During the approval process of the tower, protests arose on aesthetic and ecological grounds. Some people felt that the tower would dominate other aesthetic Canberra structures due to its location above Black Mountain and within a nature reserve. There was a brief green ban imposed by the Builders Labourers Federation (under the influence of Jack Mundey) that eventually failed. A case was brought before the High Court of Australia arguing that the Federal Government did not have the constitutional power to construct the tower (Johnson v Kent (1975) 132 CLR 164). The decision was made in favour of the government and construction was able to commence.

William Roy, at the time in charge of the Australian Broadcasting Commission’s radio and television transmitters in Canberra, was employed to supervise the installation of technical equipment in the Tower and became its first Principal Technical Officer. In 1991 Roy gave an interview to Jana Wendt, where, according to his son, he discussed the existence of a secret surveillance centre within the tower that was part of the surveillance program later revealed to be ECHELON. A short excerpt of the interview was aired as a preview of the upcoming report, however before the full interview could air a D-Notice was placed on it, barring it from broadcast.

Black Mountain Tower was opened on 15 May 1980 by Prime Minister Malcolm Fraser. It was officially named Telecom Tower, and when the telecommunications company was rebranded in 1993, became Telstra Tower.

Prior to the construction of the tower, CTC-TV (now called Southern Cross 10) had its studios located at the top of Black Mountain until new studios were constructed in Watson in 1974. Also located on the top were two guy-wired masts, one for CTC-TV channel 7 and the other one for the local ABC TV station broadcasting on channel 3. These were demolished in 1980 after the tower had opened.

The Alto Tower Restaurant, a revolving restaurant in the tower, closed on 14 February 2013.

Ownership of the Tower was transferred to Telstra's InfraCo division in 2021.

Facilities

Telstra Tower provides important communication facilities for Canberra. There are three floors of business, sales and radio communication facilities located between the 30.5 metre and 42.7 metre levels providing space for communication dishes, platforms and equipment for mobile services within the tower.

The tower's public viewing platforms provide 360 degree views of Canberra and the surrounding city and countryside. Prior to its closure to the public in mid-2021, visitors to Telstra Tower could see the city unfold from the enclosed viewing gallery or from the two open viewing platforms.

Former facilities included Canberra's only revolving restaurant which closed in 2013,  and completed a full rotation every 81 minutes, allowing diners to experience a changing view throughout their meal. In the lower level of the Tower's entrance foyer, there was an exhibition, "Making Connections", which traced the history of Australian telecommunications from the earliest days into the 21st century. A theatre showed a video, produced shortly after the tower opened, on the tower's design and construction.

Telstra Tower has become one of the most symbolic landmarks in Canberra and a major tourist attraction, with an estimated 430,000 visitors each year by 2017. In 1989 the World Federation of Great Towers invited the tower to join such distinguished monuments as the CN Tower in Toronto, Blackpool Tower in England and the Empire State Building in New York City.

Telstra Tower is one of the most visually imposing structures on the Canberra skyline, visible from many parts of Canberra and Queanbeyan.

During the COVID-19 pandemic, and the restrictions on public gatherings within the ACT,  the Tower was closed in July 2021. Since then InfraCo has been working on developing a long term strategy for the usage of the Tower.

References

External links

Telstra Tower website
Telstra Tower Black Mountain Panorama Gallery

Towers with revolving restaurants
Radio masts and towers
Skyscrapers in Canberra
Telstra
Towers completed in 1980
Towers in Australia
Tourist attractions in Canberra
1980 establishments in Australia
Observation towers
Green bans